Eesti Aeg was a newspaper in the Republic of Estonia, published as a weekly broadsheet newspaper in 1991–1995 and four issues as a monthly newsmagazine in 1996.  One of the first truly independent (of the Soviet ruling clique influences) newspapers, it was set up in 1991 after a mass exodus of staff from Eesti Ekspress after its Soviet parent company, Cross Development FSP, fired Hans H. Luik.

The newspaper was known for its courageous approach to journalism. For example, it gathered fame through publishing a list of KGB collaborationists in Estonia.

References

 entry in ESTER
 Eesti koomiks eesti ajakirjanduses 1990ndatel aastatel, a B. A. thesis by Mart Normet, Tartu 2001

1991 establishments in Estonia
1996 disestablishments in Estonia
Defunct newspapers published in Estonia
Defunct weekly newspapers
Estonian-language newspapers
Publications established in 1991
Publications disestablished in 1996